Viewdata is a Videotex implementation.  It is a type of information retrieval service in which a subscriber can access a remote database via a common carrier channel, request data and receive requested data on a video display over a separate channel. Samuel Fedida, who had the idea for Viewdata in 1968, was credited as inventor of the system which was developed while working for the British Post Office which was the operator of the national telephone system. The first prototype became operational in 1974. The access, request and reception are usually via common carrier broadcast channels.  This is in contrast with teletext.

Technology
Viewdata offered a display of 40×24 characters, based on ISO 646 (IRV IA5) – 7 bits with no accented characters.
Originally Viewdata was accessed with a special purpose terminal (or emulation software) and a modem running at ITU-T V.23 speed (1,200 bit/s down, 75 bit/s up). By 2004 it was normally accessed over TCP/IP using Viewdata client software on a personal computer running Microsoft Windows, or using a Web-based emulator.

Travel industry
As of 2015, Viewdata was still in use in the United Kingdom, mainly by the travel industry. Travel agents use it to look up the price and availability of package holidays and flights. Once they find what the customer is looking for they can place a booking.

There are a number of factors still holding up a move to a Web-based standard. Viewdata is regarded within the industry as low-cost and reliable, travel consultants have been trained to use Viewdata and would need training to book holidays on the Internet, and tour operators cannot agree on a Web-based standard.

Bulletin board systems
It was made in the late 1970s and early 1980s to make it easier for travel consultants to check availability and make bookings for holidays.
A number of Viewdata bulletin board systems existed in the 1980s, predominantly in the UK due to the proliferation of the BBC Micro, and a short-lived Viewdata Revival appeared in the late 1990s fuelled by the retrocomputing vogue. Some Viewdata boards still exist, with accessibility in the form of Java Telnet clients.

Keypad symbols: the sextile and the square

Viewdata uses special symbols already widely available on telephone keypads: the  "star" key and the  "square" key, as formally standardised by the International Telecommunication Union. These are often treated as approximately corresponding to the ASCII asterisk (*) and number sign (#), which do not necessarily conform to the ITU specifications for the keypad symbols; the asterisk is also usually displayed smaller and raised.

These symbols appear as 'Sextile' and 'Viewdata square' in the Miscellaneous Symbols and Miscellaneous Technical Unicode blocks, respectively. The sextile was added due to its use in astrology, and the square had previously appeared in the BS_Viewdata character set, as a replacement for the underscore.

In 2013, the German national body submitted a Unicode Technical Committee proposal to align the Unicode reference glyphs with the ITU specifications for these symbols, and annotate them as telephone keypad symbols on the code charts.  (Unicode 12.1), these changes have not been accepted/implemented.

See also
 Prestel

References

External links
 Definition at The Institute for Telecommunication Sciences
 Examples of existing Viewdata boards:
 NXtel (a free server, page manager and client implementation, and a public hosted service).
 Telstar Videotex Service
 Ringworld (running on the original software and hardware from the time of its original incarnation, accessed via java client)
 The Dwarfen Realm (running emulated through the web)
 Celebrating the Viewdata Revolution Including several Prestel Brochures
 vd-view A Viewtex web client for TeeFax, Telstar, CCl4 and NXTel
 vidtex An ncurses/terminal client for TeeFax, Telstar, CCl4, NXTel and others

History of computing in the United Kingdom
History of telecommunications in the United Kingdom
Legacy systems
Videotex